Atikokan Generating Station is a biomass power plant owned by Ontario Power Generation (OPG) located  north of Atikokan, Ontario ( west of Thunder Bay). The plant employs 90 people. The Atikokan Generating Station began operation as a coal fired station in 1985 and underwent an overhaul in the autumn of 2003.

Until 2012, it had one coal fueled generating unit with low nitrogen oxide (NOx) burners, providing a peak output of 230 MW fuelled by low-sulfur lignite coal from the Ravenscrag Formation in Southern Saskatchewan.

In late 2012, the facility powered down and underwent renovations, due to the Ontario government's initiative to eliminate all coal-fired electricity generation. It is the first generating station to be converted by OPG to be fueled by biomass, and is North America's largest purely biomass-fueled power plant. The conversion came at a cost of C$200 million, and the plant was re-opened on 10 September 2014.

Annual production at the plant is approximately 900 million kilowatt-hours (kWh), enough energy to supply approximately 70,000 households for one year. This plant is connected to the provincial power grid via several 230,000-volt transmission lines.

Emissions 

*Calculated figures for CO2e are rounded to the nearest tonne.

See also 

 Thunder Bay Generating Station
 Kakabeka Generating Station
 List of power stations in Canada
 List of tallest smokestacks in Canada

References

External links 
 Ontario Power Generation: Atikokan Generating Station

Coal-fired power stations in Ontario
Ontario Power Generation
Ontario electricity policy
Buildings and structures in Rainy River District
Former coal-fired power stations in Canada
Biomass power stations in Ontario
1985 establishments in Ontario
Energy infrastructure completed in 1985